This is a list of the Irish Recorded Music Association's Irish Singles Chart Top 50 number-ones of 2000.

See also
2000 in music
List of artists who reached number one in Ireland

External links
Current Irish Singles Chart – Top 50 Positions

2000 in Irish music
2000 record charts
2000